The Arikok National Park takes up approximately 18 percent of the island of Aruba and includes three primary geological formations: the Aruba lava formation, a quartz diorite formation, and a limestone formation that extends inward from the coast. These formations have directly influenced Aruba's human settlement, as well as its natural wonders.

Aruba is home to several species which only live on the island, including two unique species of snake and two bird species. Rock outcroppings also create micro-climatic conditions to support these unique plant and animal species, as well as settlements. These are located within the Arikok National Park almost exclusively. Inside the park are some of the island's oldest Arawak paintings, and has since drawn attention from the government.

Indigenous reptiles include the cascabel (Crotalus unicolor), the santanero or (Aruban) Baker's cat-eyed snake (Leptodeira bakeri), and the kododo blauw or Aruban whiptail lizard (Cnemidophorus arubensis). Birds include the shoco or Aruban burrowing owl (Athene cunicularia arubensis) and the prikichi or Aruban parakeet (Aratinga pertinax arubensis).

First designated as an important national area in the 1980s, Arikok National Park is home to popular hiking trails, covering all kinds of terrain from hills to gold mines, and even plantation ruins.

In the national park some traditional Aruban houses in the cas di torto style can be visited.

Geology
Arikok National Park showcases diverse geologic features. Included in the park lands is the Aruba Lava Formation, mostly made up of Pillow Lava intruded by quartz diorite. Additionally, much of the park land is made up of uplifted reef carbonates. This abundance of limestone has been worn away by acidic groundwater to form several caves ranging from a few to hundreds of feet in length, a few of which can be easily accessed within the park. Notable caves in the park include Fontein Cave and Quadirikiri Cave. Volcanic Tuff is also found in abundance in the national park as a result of the island's volcanic history.

Human History
The earliest traces of human activity within the park lies with Fontein Cave where pre-Columbian cave drawings can still be seen. More recent drawings can also be seen, ranging from drawings made by early European settlers to the graffiti that is currently expanding throughout the cave. As a result of the recent graffiti the cave is now gated and locked. It is only open to visitors who participate in guided tours with park staff. Another historic attraction within the park is Cunucu Arikok, an early farm that has since been restored for preservation and is open to visitors. Abandoned gold mines in the Miralamar area of the park are also visible. After closing in 1916, the gold mines and surrounding structures are now largely overgrown.

Locations of interest
 Cunucu Arikok: Remains of an old farm where various plants were cultivated. There are still cactus hedges and stonewalls visible.
 Arikok Hilltop: A viewpoint from where you can see much of the island.
 Jamanota Hilltop: The highest point on the island, 188 meters, slightly higher than Arikok Hilltop.
 Fontein Cave: A limestone cave with brownish-red pictographs probably left behind by the Arawak tribe, as well as some more recent "wall art" made by early European settlers.
 Quadirikiri Cave: Another limestone cave, home to many bats. In a couple of places there are openings in the ceiling, making these caves fairly easy to explore without too much artificial lighting.
 Boca Prins: Beach where turtles nest and a small bar/cafe.
 Dos Playa: Relatively calm seas, it is possible to surf or bodyboard here.
 Natural Pool (Conchi): A calm pond, protected from the rough seas on the east coast by surrounding rocks.

See also
Caves of Aruba

References

External links
Arikok National Park - Aruba Tourism Authority

National parks of Aruba